Paul Roderick Gregory (born 10 February 1941 in San Angelo, Texas) is a professor of economics at the University of Houston, Texas, a research fellow at the Hoover Institution and a research fellow at the German Institute for Economic Research. He has written about Russia and the Soviet Union.

He received his B. A. in 1963 and M. A. in 1964 from University of Oklahoma and his Ph.D. in economics from Harvard University in 1969. Gregory's book Women of the Gulag inspired an Oscar-shortlisted film of the same name, directed by Marianna Yarovskaya.

Publications
Women of the Gulag: Stories of Five Remarkable Lives, Hoover Institution Press, 2013
Histories of five women of diverse geographical, social, and ethnic origins: Agness Argipopulo, Maria Senotrusova, Evgenia Feigenberg, Adile Abbas-ogly, and Fekla Andreeva.
Politics, Murder and Love in Stalin's Kremlin: The Story of Nikolai Bukharin and Anna Larina, Hoover Institution Press, 2010
 Terror by Quota: State Security from Lenin to Stalin, Yale University Press, 2009
 (co-editor) "ГУЛАГ: Экономика принудительного труда", Moscow, 2008.
 Lenin’s Brain and Other Tales from the Secret Soviet Archives, Hoover Institution Press, 2008
 The Political Economy of Stalinism, Cambridge University Press, 2004 (Ed A Hewett Book Prize)
 Russian and Soviet Economic Performance and Structure, Addison-Wesley, 2001, with Robert C. Stuart
 Principles of Macroeconomics, Addison-Wesley, 2001, 7th edition, with Roy J. Ruffin
 Before Command: An Economic History of Russia from Emancipation to First Five-years Plan, Princeton University Press, 1994
 Restructuring the Soviet Economic Bureaucracy, Cambridge University Press, 1990.
 Russian National Income. 1885-1913, Cambridge University Press, 1982

See also 
 Women of the Gulag

References

External links
Paul Gregory's weblog
Paul Gregory's weblog at Forbes

Living people
21st-century American economists
Economic historians
University of Oklahoma alumni
Harvard Graduate School of Arts and Sciences alumni
Hoover Institution people
University of Houston faculty
Writers about the Soviet Union
1941 births